Aditya Rout (born 27 October 2003) is an Indian cricketer. He made his Twenty20 debut on 10 January 2021, for Odisha in the 2020–21 Syed Mushtaq Ali Trophy.

References

External links
 

2003 births
Living people
Indian cricketers
Odisha cricketers
People from Koraput
Cricketers from Odisha